RRS Sir David Attenborough is a research vessel owned by the Natural Environment Research Council and operated by the British Antarctic Survey for the purposes of both research and logistic support. The vessel is named after broadcaster and naturalist Sir David Attenborough.

Background
In 2014, the UK Government announced funding for the construction of a new polar research vessel for the British Antarctic Survey (BAS) to replace a pair of existing ships. This new ship was intended not only to be fully equipped with the latest instrumentation for the purposes of carrying out research in polar regions, for which it would have an improved icebreaking capability and greater endurance over the existing polar research vessel, but also to serve as a logistic support vessel for BAS teams in inshore locations.

BAS contracted Houlder Ltd to undertake the basic design in which suggestions for the final configuration of the new ship were taken. Following the consultation period, in 2015, Rolls-Royce Holdings was selected to execute the detailed design and Cammell Laird in Birkenhead was selected as the preferred bidder to construct the ship. The ship cost £200m.

General characteristics
Accommodation is provided for 30 crew and 60 research staff.

Sir David Attenborough has a twin-shaft hybrid diesel-electric propulsion system. The vessel's power plant consists of two  6-cylinder Bergen B33:45L6A and two  9-cylinder Bergen B33:45L9A main diesel generators, a Cummins KTA38-DM1  harbour generator, and two  battery systems each of  capacity. The power plant, which can run with different configurations depending on the mission and operating conditions, produces electricity to power four  asynchronous electric motors driving two 5-bladed controllable pitch propellers. For manoeuvring and dynamic positioning, the vessel has four  Tees White Gill thrusters with Teignbridge Propellers 60 inch 4 blade Rotor’s, two in the bow and two in the stern.

The vessel has been strengthened according to the International Association of Classification Societies (IACS) Unified Requirements for Polar Class Ships. Her ice class, Polar Class 4, is intended for year-round operation in thick first-year ice which may include old ice inclusions. However, her propulsion system is only rated for Polar Class 5 which is intended for medium first-year ice.

Construction

The first steel for the construction of the ship was cut in July 2016. The keel-laying ceremony for the ship, yard number 1390, took place on 17 October 2016.

The ship was constructed by combining individually fabricated blocks, much like the Queen Elizabeth-class aircraft carriers. The majority of the blocks were manufactured by Cammell Laird at Birkenhead, but due to a tight schedule, the stern of the ship (named 'Block 10') was fabricated by the A&P Group at Hebburn on the River Tyne. The section was transported to Merseyside on a barge in August 2017. The stern section was loaded onto the barge by heavy lifting company ALE, using self-propelled modular trailers (SPMT). The same procedure in reverse was then used to get the hull segment on to the slipway at Birkenhead. The hull of Sir David Attenborough was named by her namesake and launched on 14 July 2018. She was moved into a wet dock for the addition of her superstructure and fitting out. The ship was originally scheduled to be completed by October 2018. The official naming ceremony took place on 26 September 2019. A bottle of champagne was smashed across the ship's bow by Catherine, Duchess of Cambridge at Cammell Laird's shipyard in Birkenhead. Sir David Attenborough was present at the ceremony. Poet Laureate Simon Armitage wrote a poem "Ark" to celebrate the naming ceremony. Attenborough was also present at commissioning, stating "This astonishing ship... will find the science with which to deal with the problems that are facing the world today and will increasingly do so tomorrow."

Service

Sir David Attenborough was originally planned to enter service in late 2020, but in January 2020 Sky News reported that her delivery was at risk of delay, and that BAS planned to keep James Clark Ross in service for another year past her intended retirement.  In August, Sir David Attenborough made a brief trip to the Liverpool Cruise Terminal before returning to Cammell Laird for final fitting out ahead of sea trials scheduled for late in the year.
Sir David Attenborough began her sea trials on 21 October 2020. On 5 March 2021, an accident during a launching drill of a lifeboat resulted in injuries to a crew member. She officially made her maiden voyage to Antarctica on 16 November 2021, from Harwich and arrived at the Rothera Research Station on 17 December 2021 for the first time.

In February 2022, RRS Sir David Attenborough encountered second-year ice with thick snow layer on top that she could not overcome on her own while the vessel was attempting to reach Stange Sound in the English Coast in Antarctica. The vessel then collaborated with the French icebreaking cruise ship operated by Compagnie du Ponant, Le Commandant Charcot, which opened a channel for the research vessel. However, as the ice conditions became even more unfavourable, RRS Sir David Attenborough had to give up the original plan and seek another drop-off point to deliver scientific cargo to support the International Thwaites Glacier Collaboration.

Naming poll

In March 2016, the Natural Environment Research Council (NERC) announced that members of the public were being asked to suggest names for the ship. Names previously used would not be eligible, but otherwise it was open to suggestions. The NERC stated that they would have the final say, and that the most popular name in the poll would not necessarily be the one used.

Former BBC Radio Jersey presenter James Hand jokingly suggested RRS "Boaty McBoatface". This quickly became the most popular choice and was the runaway winner when the poll closed, with 124,109 votes. The name has been described as a homage to "Hooty McOwlface", an owl named through an "Adopt-A-Bird" programme in 2012 that became popular on the internet.

On 6 May 2016, British science minister Jo Johnson announced that the choice had been made to name the ship after naturalist Sir David Attenborough, but that Boaty McBoatface would be the name of one of David Attenborough remotely controlled submersibles.

A petition calling for Sir David Attenborough to change his name to Sir Boaty McBoatface "in the interest of democracy and humour" soon received over 3,800 signatures.

In response to the poll, the Science and Technology Committee, a select committee of the House of Lords, announced that they were to review the process by which the ship was named. NERC chief executive Professor Duncan Wingham and NERC head of communications Julia Maddock faced the committee on 10 May. Professor James Wilsdon, an outreach director at Sheffield University, told MPs that he voted for Boaty McBoatface. Despite the controversy, NERC directors felt that their poll was a successful initiative in that it generated a lot of publicity regarding their organisation and research mission among the lay public.

Other leading choices in the poll were Poppy-Mai, in honour of a toddler with incurable cancer, and Henry Worsley, for a British army officer who died in 2016 while attempting to complete the first solo and unaided crossing of the Antarctic.

Spanish internet trolls from the forum ForoCoches promoted the choice Blas de Lezo, a Spanish admiral who gave a humiliating defeat to the British Royal Navy in 1741 in the War of Jenkins' Ear. The organisers removed the option, which gathered more than 38,000 votes.

See also
 List of things named after David Attenborough and his works

References

David Attenborough
Icebreakers of the United Kingdom
Research vessels of the United Kingdom
British Antarctic Survey
2018 ships
Ships built on the River Mersey

External links

Ship's current position